William Henry Rafferty (born 30 December 1950) is a retired Scottish footballer who played as a forward. He appeared in the Football League for Coventry City, Blackpool, Plymouth Argyle, Carlisle United, Wolverhampton Wanderers, Newcastle United, Portsmouth and AFC Bournemouth, scoring 145 goals in 468 matches. He finished his career in Portugal with spells at Louletano and Farense.

Rafferty began his league career with Coventry City after joining them from Port Glasgow but found opportunities few and far between. A move to Blackpool in 1972 saw him play and score more regularly before joining Plymouth Argyle a year later. With his striking partner, Paul Mariner, he became an important player in the Argyle side that won promotion to the Football League Second Division in 1975. Their partnership contributed 47 goals to the campaign, with Rafferty scoring 26.

He then joined Carlisle United where he continued to score regularly. He moved on to Wolverhampton Wanderers and Newcastle United. After Newcastle he joined Portsmouth in 1980. At Portsmouth, Rafferty once again became a key striker, winning the Third Division championship in 1983 before joining AFC Bournemouth, which would be his last league club in England.

References

1950 births
Living people
Coventry City F.C. players
Blackpool F.C. players
Plymouth Argyle F.C. players
Carlisle United F.C. players
Wolverhampton Wanderers F.C. players
Newcastle United F.C. players
Portsmouth F.C. players
AFC Bournemouth players
Louletano D.C. players
Scottish expatriate sportspeople in Portugal
Footballers from Glasgow
Association football forwards
Scottish footballers
Scottish expatriate footballers
Expatriate footballers in Portugal
Primeira Liga players